Cipriscola fasciata is a species of beetle in the family Cerambycidae, and the only species in the genus Cipriscola. It was described by Thomson in 1860.

References

Onciderini
Beetles described in 1860